In enzymology, a methylglyoxal reductase (NADPH-dependent) is an enzyme that catalyzes the chemical reaction

lactaldehyde + NADP+  methylglyoxal + NADPH + H+

Thus, the two substrates of this enzyme are lactaldehyde and NADP+, whereas its 3 products are methylglyoxal, NADPH, and H+.

This enzyme belongs to the family of oxidoreductases, specifically those acting on the CH-OH group of donor with NAD+ or NADP+ as acceptor. The systematic name of this enzyme class is lactaldehyde:NADP+ oxidoreductase. Other names in common use include lactaldehyde dehydrogenase (NADP+), and Gre2.

References

 
 

EC 1.1.1
NADPH-dependent enzymes
Enzymes of unknown structure